Paul Y. Anderson (August 29, 1893 – December 6, 1938) was an American journalist. He was a pioneering muckraker and played a role in exposing the Teapot Dome scandal of the 1920s. His coverage included the 1917 race riots in East St. Louis and the Scopes Trial. In 1929 he received a Pulitzer Prize.

Background
Anderson was born in Knoxville, Tennessee, to William and Elizabeth Anderson on August 29, 1893. He was the only son among the three of six children that survived infancy. When he was three, his father, a stonecutter, was killed when a faulty derrick fell on him in a quarry. To make ends meet, Anderson's mother returned to teaching school. Unlike most young men of the time, Anderson graduated from high school with a major in history. To help the family, Paul delivered telegrams and newspapers.

Career

Knoxville
In 1911, Anderson, then 17, was hired as a reporter for the Knoxville Journal.

St. Louis
His demonstrated ability resulted in his move to the St. Louis Times in 1912, the St. Louis Star in 1913. In 1914 Anderson married Beatrice Wright of East St. Louis and that year he came to work at the St. Louis Post-Dispatch. Although he enrolled in some correspondence courses during his career, Anderson never obtained a college degree.  The Post Dispatch published his stories for the next 23 years.

When he arrived at the Post Dispatch, Anderson came under the supervision of managing editor, O.K. Bovard. It was a very fortuitous match of a young energetic reporter with an editor with the drive to build the Post-Dispatch into a newspaper that became internationally recognized for its honest and adroit reporting.

Anderson first came to national attention in 1917 when a congressional committee investigated the East St. Louis Race Riots. As a reporter covering East St. Louis for the Post Dispatch, Anderson was one of many newspaper reporters called to testify. In its report to the House of Representatives, the committee singled out Anderson for praise. Anderson, the committee said "reported what he saw without fear of consequences; defied the indignant officials whom he charged with criminal neglect of duty; ran the daily risk of assassination, and rendered invaluable public service by his exposures." As his national reputation soared, Anderson's personal life deteriorated. He was divorced from his first wife in 1919.

Anderson also undertook a successful campaign to release those prisoners who were imprisoned for various alleged offenses in the course of World War I.  "When the Post-Dispatch, in 1923, launched its crusade to get freedom for the political prisoners who had been run into jail by government Cossacks [federal and state prosecutors], it was Anderson who performed the field work.  When he was through firing, the political prisoners were out of jail, and the first national crusade of the Post Dispatch had become a triumph."

Washington
In 1923, after two years as an editorial writer, Anderson was unable to persuade the Post-Dispatch to send him to Washington D.C. so he resigned and went to the capitol as a freelance reporter. His early work on the Teapot Dome Scandal disclosed that Secretary of the Interior, Albert Fall, had accepted a bribe of $230,000 to lease oil lands in Teapot Dome, Wyoming, and Elk Hills, California to branches of Standard Oil. His performance convinced Bovard to rehire him in 1924. In that same year he was sent to Chicago to cover the trial of Nathan Leopold and Richard Loeb, both 19, who had abducted and murdered 14-year-old Bobby Franks. Loeb and Leopold were both the sons of very wealthy families. In 1925, he was sent to Dayton, Tennessee, to cover the Scopes "Monkey Trial", in which public school teacher, John Scopes was put on trial for teaching evolution. As a result of these assignments, Anderson became friends with such prominent people as Clarence Darrow, and H.L. Mencken.

In 1925 Anderson contributed to an investigation which led to the resignation of Federal Judge George W. English, and in 1926 he debunked an AP story that stated that the socialist government of Mexico was attempting to "establish a "Bolshevik hegemony" between the US and the Panama Canal". Finding no evidence for the charge, Anderson wrote a story identifying the source of the story which was a State Department official. The official quickly retracted the charge.

Anderson remarried in 1928. His second wife was Anna Fritschie of St. Louis. In 1928, Bovard also asked Anderson to look into what had happened to the other $2,770,000 in Liberty Bonds that had not been given to Secretary of the Interior Fall as a bribe. If $230,000 in bonds had been used to bribe Fall, had the rest of the $3,000,000 in bonds been used to bribe others? When the Coolidge Administration refused to reopen the investigation, Anderson, prevailed upon his friend, Republican Senator George Norris, to introduce a resolution in the Senate to reopen the investigation. The resolution passed unanimously.

As a result of the ensuing congressional investigation and government prosecutions, Robert W. Stewart, head of Standard Oil of Indiana, was indicted for contempt of the Senate and perjury. Although acquitted in both cases, he was later removed from his job. Oil magnate Harry Sinclair was jailed, as was Secretary Fall. Stewart and James O'Neil, another principal in the scandal later made restitution. The government eventually recovered $6,000,000. For his efforts in reopening the investigation, Anderson received the Pulitzer Prize in 1929.

In 1929, Anderson began writing for the Nation Magazine. He reported on the efforts of power companies to stop government development of power in Muscle Shoals, Alabama. He referred to Herbert Hoover as "The Great White Feather" and  expressed admiration for the populism of Louisiana governor Huey Long. When the Great Depression hit he embraced the National Recovery Act stating "there is a very serious question about whether we can end this depression before revolution breaks out. When ten million men have been without work for three years and are asking themselves whether they will ever work again, when they have seen their women fade and their babies wither and die, when they have seen their boys turn to thievery and their girls to prostitution, it strikes me as a poor time to play dilettante over the classical ideas of Jeffersonian democracy."

In 1932, Anderson recommended that Marguerite Young take a job with the New York World-Telegram, which she did.  (The following year, she left for The Daily Worker, after which she introduced Soviet spy Hede Massing to American diplomat Noel Field.)

When the demands of his occupation pressed heavily upon him, Anderson began to drink heavily. His attempts and those of the Post Dispatch to help him curb his drinking were ultimately unsuccessful. He was hospitalized at Johns Hopkins in 1933 and 1934. He received a get-well letter from then President Franklin D. Roosevelt on October 9, 1933. A March 7, 1934 column in The Nation entitled "Amenities from a hospital pallet" was written for Anderson.  In 1936, he divorced his second wife.

In 1937  Anderson seemed to regain his old touch when he won the Headliners' Club Award for exposing and authenticating the suppressed Paramount newsreel which showed the killing of ten workers by police patrolling the struck Republic Steel Plant near Chicago. On August 30, 1937, Anderson married actress and radio personality Katherine Lane but they soon separated. In January, 1938, Anderson was dismissed by the Post-Dispatch for prolonged absences and inattention to his job. He was quickly hired by the St. Louis Star-Times for its Washington Bureau.

In October he took a foray into radio and denounced the conduct of Martin Dies, Chairman of the House Un-American Activities Committee.

Anderson became increasingly despondent. One of his last columns was about the Munich Agreement in October 1938.

Personal and death
In 1914 Anderson married Beatrice Wright of East St. Louis. They had two sons, Paul Webster, and Kenneth Paine. They divorced in 1919 and he remarried in 1928 to Anna Fritschie. Anderson divorced again in 1936 and married Katherine Lane the next year.

On December 6, 1938, he took an overdose of sleeping pills, leaving behind a note saying his "usefulness was at an end."

At his funeral the eulogy was delivered by United Mine Workers president John L. Lewis. One of his pallbearers was an old friend, now Associate Justice of the Supreme Court, Hugo Black.

After serving in World War II, both Paul and Kenneth moved to Southern California. Paul pursued a career as a brick mason. He and his wife, Margaret had no children. Kenneth went to work in the aerospace industry and became president of a small company that made fasteners and rivets for airplanes. He and his wife Irma had five children: Kenneth Jr. (1944–2004) John (1947) Katherine (1948), Paula (1949–2008) and Douglas (1951). Paul Y. Anderson is survived by four great-grandsons and one great-granddaughter.

Legacy
Anderson has been praised as a brilliant reporter and writer while others have criticized his drinking, "prosecutorial complex", and the bitterness of some of his writing.

The most moving tribute to Anderson came from Heywood Broun, who took exception to an article in Time calling attention to Anderson's drinking. Anderson, Broun wrote, had worked "constantly under punishing tension" and had worn "a hair shirt of complete dedication to the things in which he believed," adding: But just about the last person in the world with any right to mention the matter is some little snip sitting with scissors and paste pot in the office of Time piecing out the curious sign language in which that magazine is written for the delectation of commuters and clubwomen. Paul Y. Anderson, drunk or sober, was by so much the finest journalist of his day that it is not fitting for any  moist-eared chit even to touch the hem of his weakness. It is not necessary for anybody to make apologies for Paul Y. Anderson. Taken in his entirety, he stands up as a man deserving love and homage from every working newspaperman and woman in the United States. We will carry on.

Works
Friends published a collection of Anderson's works along with their own essays about him.

 Where is There Another? A Memorial to Paul Y. Anderson with Freda Kirchwey et al. (1939)

References

External sources
 Edmund B. Lambeth, University of Kentucky, Paul Y. Anderson from Dictionary of Literary Biography 2005–2006.
 St. Louis Journalism Review, July- August 2008.
 Paul Y. Anderson, The Nation, August 7, 1937.
 Lillian Elkin, Journalism Quarterly, Fall 1982.

American investigative journalists
American newspaper reporters and correspondents
1893 births
1938 suicides
Drug-related suicides in the United States
St. Louis Post-Dispatch people
People from Knoxville, Tennessee
Journalists from Tennessee
American male journalists
20th-century American journalists
20th-century American male writers
Pulitzer Prize for Reporting winners